Bhadrachalam Assembly constituency is a ST reserved constituency of Telangana Legislative Assembly, India. It includes the temple town of Bhadrachalam. It is one among 10 constituencies in Khammam district. It is part of Mahabubabad Lok Sabha constituency.

Sunnam Rajaiah, the Floor Leader of CPM in Telangana Legislative Assembly was representing the constituency.

Mandals
The Assembly Constituency presently comprises the following Mandals:

Members of Legislative Assembly

Election results

Telangana Legislative Assembly election, 2018

Telangana Legislative Assembly election, 2014

Assembly Election, 2009

1957 By-election

1952

See also
 List of constituencies of Telangana Legislative Assembly

References

Assembly constituencies of Telangana
Khammam district